North Carolina's 32nd Senate district is one of 50 districts in the North Carolina Senate. It has been represented by Democrat Paul Lowe Jr. since 2015.

Geography
Since 2003, the district has included part of Forsyth County. The district overlaps with the 71st, 72nd, and 74th state house districts.

District officeholders

Election results

2022

2020

2018

2016

2014

2012

2010

2008

2006

2004

2002

2000

References

North Carolina Senate districts
Forsyth County, North Carolina